Sibel Özkan (born March 3, 1988, in Afyonkarahisar) is a Turkish weightlifter competing in the Women's 48 kg division.

She initially won the silver medal in the 48 kg event at the 2008 Summer Olympics, but in 2016 her result was annulled due to a doping violation upon reanalysis of samples from 2008.

Personal life
She was born on March 3, 1988, to Ramazan and his wife to Kezban in Kozluca village of Afyonkarahisar, Turkey as the youngest of three siblings. As she was three years of age, her parents divorced. Unable to look after her children, the mother placed Sİbel's brother Bülent, at that time four years old, and Özgür, who was five years old, into a children's dormitory in Afyonkarahisar. However, Sibel had to be moved to another city, since the orphanage was only for boys. She was put in a children's home in Konya.

Her mother Kezban Özkan died one year after she placed her children in orphanages. Sibel's brothers joined her in the same orphanage in Konya two years later.

As she was 13 years of age, Sibel shifted to another orphanage in the same city. There, she started to perform sports with judo. However, her interest changed soon to weightlifting despite her brother's opposition. She was trained by Süreyya Horasanlı and Sami Özsu, becoming successful at national and international championships in the 48 kg category. Sibel is member of the weightlifting-specialized sports club of Kuyulusebil Halter İhtisas S.K. in Konya.

After finishing the high school at the age of 18, she attended Gaziosmanpaşa University in Tokat to study physical education and sports, where she is still a student.

In 2009, Sibel married to Ömer Öz, a medal-winning Turkish weightlifter, whom she was engaged to since 2006. The couple separated  the same year.

Achievements and honours
After coming fourth in the snatch event at the 2007 World Weightlifting Championships - Women's 48 kg, she won her first Olympics silver medal in the Beijing Summer Olympics on August 9, 2008, held at the Beijing University of Aeronautics and Astronautics Gymnasium coming second to the then winner of the 2007 World Weightlifting Championships - Women's 48 kg Xiexia Chen. Sibel won the silver medal with 111.0 kg in the Clean and Jerk achieving 199.0 kg in total.

Achieving 117.0 kg in the 48 kg Clean and Jerk category at the 2009 World Weightlifting Championships held in Goyang, South Korea, Sibel Özkan became Turkey's first ever female gold medalist in weightlifting at world championships.

Doping case
In 2016, the International Olympic Committee requested the return of the silver medal that she won at the 2008 Summer Olympics in Beijing, China, due to her failing a repeated drug test for using Stanozolol.

Stats and records
Olympic Games

World Championships

European Championships

Mediterranean Games

Legend:
 ERJ European Record Juniors

References

External links
 Beijing 2008 Athlete Profile

1988 births
People from Afyonkarahisar
Living people
Weightlifters at the 2008 Summer Olympics
Olympic weightlifters of Turkey
World Weightlifting Championships medalists
Turkish female weightlifters
European champions for Turkey
Doping cases in weightlifting
Turkish sportspeople in doping cases
Competitors stripped of Summer Olympics medals

Mediterranean Games silver medalists for Turkey
Competitors at the 2005 Mediterranean Games
Competitors at the 2013 Mediterranean Games
Mediterranean Games medalists in weightlifting
European Weightlifting Championships medalists
21st-century Turkish sportswomen